Syntypistis spitzeri is a species of moth of the family Notodontidae first described by Alexander Schintlmeister in 1987. It is found in Vietnam and the Chinese provinces of Jiangxi, Guangxi, and Yunnan.

References

Moths described in 1987
Notodontidae